Anne Marie Warner  (born 5 December 1945) is a former Australian politician who served in the Queensland Legislative Assembly from 1983 to 1995. She was a government minister under Wayne Goss from 1989 to 1995.

Early life
Warner was born in Lucknow, India, and is of Anglo-Indian descent.  She was a social welfare union organiser before entering politics.

Politics
Warner was elected to the Legislative Assembly of Queensland for Kurilpa in 1983, and for South Brisbane in 1986. She was Minister for Family Services and Minister for Aboriginal and Islander Affairs in the Labor Party government of Wayne Goss from 1989 until her retirement in 1995. Her party activity included being a branch President and President of her Electorate Executive, a State Conference delegate and Convenor of the Women's Policy Committee. Warner is married and has three children.

During Warner's six years in opposition, she spoke vociferously on a wide range of issues including civil rights, education, government maladministration, corruption, and child welfare. Throughout her parliamentary career she showed great concern for minority groups and women, especially disadvantaged women, and their right to be free from any sort of discrimination.

Footnotes

1945 births
Living people
Members of the Queensland Legislative Assembly
Politicians from Lucknow
Australian people of Anglo-Indian descent
Indian emigrants to Australia
Australian Labor Party members of the Parliament of Queensland
Members of the Order of Australia
Women members of the Queensland Legislative Assembly